Tomas Henry Gaynor (born 21 February 1991), known professionally as Allday, is an Australian rapper, singer and songwriter from Adelaide, South Australia. Gaynor became active in 2011, when he began uploading his music for free online. Following his works becoming increasingly popular, he moved to Melbourne, Victoria, to pursue a serious career before later relocating to Los Angeles, California, in February 2017. His works have been influenced by acts such as Silverchair, Frank Ocean, and TLC. Gaynor released his debut album, Startup Cult, in July 2014 to Australian audiences. Startup Cult achieved success and reached number three on the ARIA Charts.

Life and career
Tom's mother is from England. He previously attended Mercedes College in Adelaide.

2011–2013: Early life and career origins and mixtapes
Tom previously played in a harmonica band called Sissycunt at school, which generated his interest in music. He began producing works under the name Allday in January 2011, after dropping out of art school. In 2011 Tom said "I basically grew up in the hip hop scene; I would have been about eleven years old when I went to my first show. I've done the shaved head and the air max thing when I was younger." 

In September 2011, Allday released his free for download debut mixtape Noue Yesue (pronounced "No-way Yes-Way") Followed by Soon I'll Be in Cali.

In 2011, Allday was a runner-up Raw Comedy national final. 

On 3 May 2012, Allday released A Skateboard Soirée for free on his Bandcamp. A Skateboard Soirée received nationwide airplay on Triple J and earned him & producer C1 "Unearthed Artist of the Week" honours. The single "So Good" was released, and peaked at number 91 on the Triple J Hottest 100, 2012.

In December 2012 Allday released his fourth free for download mixtape, Euphoria. The mixtape features production from C1, Soul Marauder, Savo and Woodz from Sweden. 

In April 2013, Allday released his debut EP, Loners Are Cool, which peaked at number 18 on the ARIA Charts. In July 2013, Allday released his fifth free for download mixtape, Soon I'll Be in Cali 2.

2014–2015: OneTwo Records, Loners Are Cool and Startup Cult
In December 2013, Allday signed with OneTwo Records and released "Claude Monet".

He went on a national tour of Australia in May and June 2014. Labelled the Right Now National Tour, he held concerts in Western Australia, South Australia, Victoria, New South Wales and Queensland. His debut album to be released in-stores nationally was Startup Cult in July 2014, which a week after its release reached number 3 on the ARIA Albums Chart. It was supported by a headlining tour around Australia. In December 2014 he released the single "Wolves" featuring Sunni Colón. He featured on Tasmanian singer Asta's song "Dynamite" in 2015.

In July 2015, Allday released another mixtape titled Soft Grunge Love Rap. Allday said "This is a mixtape I made really quick because my album is taking forever and I wanted to put some new songs out." A single "Grammy" was released.

In 2015, he was featured on the Troye Sivan song "For Him." on his album Blue Neighbourhood, which was released 4 December 2015.

2016–2017: Speeding
On 23 June 2016—after a delay from his new label, Wind Up Records—Allday released "Monster Truck", which was produced by Bill Nye the Science Guy, one of his frequent collaborators. On 15 July 2016 he released the lead single from his upcoming second album, the single was premiered on Triple J and is called "Sides" (featuring Nyne). He later released the single "Send Nudes" on 24 August 2016 which hit the top ten on the iTunes hip-hop charts. He released his fourth single of 2016 on 15 December, titled "Raceway".
In March, Allday announced his second studio album, titled Speeding, and released a third single "In Motion", with fellow Australian producer Japanese Wallpaper. The album was released on April 21, 2017. He toured his album Speeding around Regional Australia with Arno Faraji and Kinder as supports.

2018–2019: Starry Night Over the Phone
In November 2018, Allday released "Wonder Drug", the lead single from his third studio album. The album, titled Starry Night Over the Phone, was released on 12 July 2019, peaked at #7 in Australia; becoming his third top ten album. Allday mentioned in an interview with Time magazine that he got jumped for his phone one starry night, and this is why the album was so personal to him.

2020–present: Drinking with My Smoking Friends
In March 2021, Allday announced the release of his fourth studio album Drinking with My Smoking Friends, released on 28 May 2021. The album peaked at number 13 on the ARIA Charts. 

In November 2021, Allday returned with the standalone single, "Eyes on the Prize".

In September 2022, Allday released "Runtrack" and announced an Australian tour, commencing in November 2022. On 7 October 2022, Allday released Excuse Me.

Discography

Studio albums

Mixtapes

Compilations

Extended plays

Singles

As lead artist

As featured artist

Awards and nominations

AIR Awards
The Australian Independent Record Awards (commonly known informally as AIR Awards) is an annual awards night to recognise, promote and celebrate the success of Australia's Independent Music sector. This Award is prestigious in Australia. 

|-
| AIR Awards of 2014
|Startup Cult 
| Best Independent Hip Hop/Urban Album
| 
|-
| AIR Awards of 2018
| Speeding
| Best Independent Hip Hop/Urban Album
| 
|-
| AIR Awards of 2020
| Starry Night Over the Phone
| Best Independent Hip Hop/Urban Album
| 
|-

Fowler's Live Music Awards
The Fowler's Live Music Awards took place from 2012 to 2014 to "recognise success and achievement over the past 12 months [and] celebrate the great diversity of original live music" in South Australia. Since 2015 they're known as the South Australian Music Awards.

 
|-
| 2014
| Allday
| Best Hip Hop Artist
| 
|-

National Live Music Awards
The National Live Music Awards (NLMAs) are a broad recognition of Australia's diverse live industry, celebrating the success of the Australian live scene. The awards commenced in 2016.

|-
| National Live Music Awards of 2019
| Allday
| Live Hip Hop Act of the Year
| 
|-

References

Australian male rappers
Living people
1991 births